School debating in Scotland is a competitive activity taken up on an extracurricular basis by many schools across the country. The main format of schools debating in Scotland is British Parliamentary Style, and competitions in this format are mostly run by universities across Scotland, although more national university competitions, such as Oxford and Cambridge, hold regional rounds in Scotland as well. The BP format of debating consists of teams of two from individual schools. However, School debaters also have the opportunity to debate in the Worlds format of debating, if they are selected to represent their country as Team Scotland at the World Schools Debating Championships. Each year, twelve school pupils  are chosen to trial and from this group a team of five is chosen.

Scotland has won this tournament 4 times, in 1990,1999, 2007 and 2012, and reached the outrounds of the competition every year since they began competing in it, except in the 2013 tournament, held in Antalya, Turkey.

The Law Society Donald Dewar Memorial Debating Tournament

This competition, organised by the Law Society of Scotland, is a Scottish schools debating competition, with the trophy currently held by the 2016 winners, Caitlin Sherrett and Finlay Allmond of Nairn Academy. The tournament is currently sponsored by the Glasgow Bar Association and Simpson and Warwick Solicitors. The 2007 final was won by Craigmount High School of Edinburgh and chaired by Nicola Sturgeon MSP. The High School of Dundee finished second. The 2008 final was won by Joanna Farmer and Michael Sim of Robert Gordon's College, and the High School of Dundee again finished second. In 2009, Allen Farrington and Cosmo Grant, from The Glasgow Academy won the trophy. In 2010, the trophy was retained by The Glasgow Academy by Séamus Macdonald McGuigan and Oscar Lee. Craigmount High School dominated the early 2010s winning the trophy in both 2012 and 2014. In 2015, Jamie MacLeod and Ewan Redpath of Madras College, St Andrews, won the competition. The 2016 final was won by Finlay Allmond and Caitlin Sherret of Nairn Academy.

The Courier and Chartered Institute of Bankers in Scotland Schools Junior Debating Competition
This competition is organised by the Courier newspaper, and is open to Junior school debaters in the area covered by the newspaper. It is sponsored by the Chartered Institute of Bankers in Scotland. The competition is in extended BP format, with three teams on each side rather than the more usual two, and is run on a knock-out basis, with 72 original teams being reduced to six finalists over the course of preparation rounds. There are many school s competing for the grand prize, from all over Scotland. The Grand Final is run, with the help of the University of St Andrews Union Debating Society, in Lower Parliament Hall, St Andrews, with the winners receiving a trip to America, and the runners-up a break in London. In the 2002 Grand Final, the Judges deemed that the quality of debate was so high that all competing teams were given honorary membership of University of St Andrews Union Debating Society.

Winners of the 2006/2007 competition were Shona Young and Kirsty Paterson-Hunter of Kinross High School, who spoke in opposition to the motion that 'This House Would ban non-reconstructive cosmetic surgery' winning on a unanimous vote. Runners-up were Marianne Inglis and Catherine Lovegrove from Morrison's Academy who argued for the motion.

Winners of the 2007/2008 competition were Emma Robertson and Ruth Thomson of Morrison's Academy, Crieff. The motion was "This House would ban Gambling" and the team successfully opposed the motion and won an all expenses paid trip to America. Among the finalists were a team from  Robert Gordon's, two Morrison's teams, and a team from St John's.

For the 2009-'10 season, the competition will not run and its future looks to be in turmoil since the main sponsor (CIOBS) pulled out.  There is however a new competition which has been formed to replace it, run with the support of GSK it will start in the spring of 2010. The new competition, the East of Scotland Debater, has since started. Regional heats have taken place and the final will be held on 4 June in St Andrews University's Parliament Hall. Finalists are Robert Gordon's College, Morrison's Academy, the High School of Dundee and Forfar Academy.

The ESU Scotland Juniors Competition

The largest competition in Scotland for S1-S3 debaters and is run by English-Speaking Union Scotland. The 2006/7 competition received 113 entries. The competition is in BP format, with four teams of two competing in the debate.

The 2007 grand final took place in the National Galleries of Scotland. The winners were Georgina Barker and Hannah Mackaness of George Heriot's School. The other finalists were Emma Robertson and Catherine Lovegrove of Morrison's Academy who were the runners-up and also St. Thomas Aquinas Secondary School and Dumfries Academy.
The 2012 Grand Final took place in the Scottish Parliament building. The finalists were teams from George Heriot's School, Mearns Castle High School, Grove Academy and St Columba's School. The final was won by the team from St Columba's. 
The 2014 Grand Final also took place in the Scottish Parliament building. The finalists were teams from George Heriot's School, Dollar Academy, George Watson's College and Douglas Academy. The final was won by the team from Douglas Academy.
The 2015 Grand Final was hosted by Standard Life in Edinburgh. The finalists were teams from Clifton Hall School, Morrison's Academy, George Watson's College and Renfrew High School. The final was won by the team from Clifton Hall School.

Aberdeen University Debater Schools Competition

Glasgow University Union Schools Debating competition

2010's tournament is believed to have been held on Monday 1 November and the winners were Callum Worsley and Ruth Cameron (1st proposition) of Dollar Academy "A". The other finalists included Dollar Academy "C" (Thomas Clode and Anna George) and George Heriot's "A". They are believed to have debated the motion "This House would legalise gay marriage."

Forty teams from all over Scotland and northern England competed debating four motions: "This House would use torture in the interrogation of terror suspects"; "This House would make Gaelic compulsory in schools"; and "This House would make foreign aid conditional on the promotion of women's rights"; "This house would impose harsher sentences on celebrity criminals".

Edinburgh University Schools

Other tournaments

 ESU Mace - a competition open to schools throughout Britain
 The Glasgow University Union Schools' Debating Tournament
 The University of Dundee Schools' Competition
 The University of St Andrews Senior Schools' Debating Competition.
 Aberdeen University Debater Schools' Competition
 Edinburgh University Schools' Competition
 Edinburgh University Juniors Schools' Debating Competition
 Robert Gordon's Juniors School's Debating Competition

References

External links 

Debating
Competitions in Scotland
Schools debating competitions
British debating competitions